Olive Howard is a former Papua New Guinea international lawn bowler.

Bowls career
In 1973 she won the triples bronze medal with Con Newbury and Margaret Ramsbotham at the 1973 World Outdoor Bowls Championship.

References

Living people
Papua New Guinean female bowls players
Year of birth missing (living people)